The 2019–20 season was the fourth in League One, the third tier of the English football league system, for AFC Wimbledon since their promotion in 2016 from League Two. Along with competing in League One, the Kingston upon Thames-based club participated in three cup competitions, the FA Cup, EFL Cup and EFL Trophy, failing to progress past the first stage of any of them.

Squad

Pre-season
Dons announced pre-season friendlies against Wexford, Brentford, Bristol City, 1. FC Kaiserslautern, Kickers Offenbach, Bournemouth, Metropolitan Police, Hampton & Richmond Borough and Crystal Palace.

Competitions

League One

League table

Results summary

Results by matchday

Matches
On Thursday, 20 June 2019, the EFL League One fixtures were revealed.

FA Cup

The first round draw was made on 21 October 2019.

EFL Cup

The first round draw was made on 20 June.

EFL Trophy

On 9 July 2019, the pre-determined group stage draw was announced with Invited clubs to be drawn on 12 July 2019.

Transfers

Transfers in

Loans in

Loans out

Transfers out

Player statistics

Appearances and goals

References

AFC Wimbledon seasons
AFC Wimbledon